Raphael Finkel (born 1951) is an American computer scientist and a professor at the University of Kentucky.  He compiled the first version of the Jargon File. He is the author of An Operating Systems Vade Mecum, a textbook on operating systems, and Advanced Programming Language Design, an introductory book on programming paradigms. Finkel and J.L. Bentley created the data structure called the quadtree.

Biography
Finkel was born in Chicago. He entered the University of Chicago, where he earned his BA in mathematics and MA in teaching. He then earned a PhD at Stanford University under the supervision of Vinton Cerf.

Finkel is also an activist for the survival of the Yiddish language, promoting its use and providing fonts, various texts, and tools for writing Yiddish in personal computers.

Notes

External links
http://goanna.cs.rmit.edu.au/~santhas/research/paper1/node4.html

Living people
1951 births
American computer scientists
University of Chicago alumni
Stanford University alumni
University of Kentucky faculty
20th-century American Jews
21st-century American Jews